The South Atlantic Current is an eastward ocean current, fed by the Brazil Current. That fraction of it which reaches the African coast feeds the Benguela Current. It is continuous with the northern edge of the Antarctic Circumpolar Current.

The seafaring is usually easier and thus safer in area of the South Atlantic Current than in the Antarctic Circumpolar Current, though also slower. It is a cold current.

See also 
 Antarctic Circumpolar Current
 Ocean current
 Oceanic gyres
 Physical oceanography

References 
 

Currents of the Atlantic Ocean